Dusona elegans is a species of parasitic wasps in the tribe Limneriini. It is found in Tanzania. The holotype is in the Naturhistoriska Riksmuseet, Stockholm.

References

External links 

 Dusona elegans at waspweb.org

Campopleginae
Insects described in 1908
Fauna of Tanzania